Rugsted & Kreutzfeldt is a Danish singing duo made up of Jens Rugsted and Stig Kreutzfeldt, and were very active from 1979 to 1984 and had a series of very successful albums in a smooth West Coast rock style. Their 1979 song "Jeg ved det godt" became a classic "evergreen" hit. Most of their big hits were written by Dan Turèll. 

The duo split in 1984, but continued to work with other artists like Sanne Salomonsen, Thomas Helmig, Allan Olsen and Kim Larsen.

The duo had a comeback from 2006 on with many releases and rereleases. In 2011, they released Rugsted & Kreutzfeldt 5. It hit #3 on the Danish Albums Chart in its first week of release.

Discography

Albums
1979: Rugsted Kreutzfeldt 1
1980: Rugsted Kreutzfeldt 2
1982: Rugsted Kreutzfeldt 3
1984: R'n'K Band - English Compilation
1985: Jorden kalder
1988: Rugsted Kreutzfeldt 1+2 (rerelease)
1996: Scrapbog
2005: Tilfældigvis forbi
2007: Går gennem tiden 1977-2007 (compilation)
2011: Rugsted & Kreutzfeldt 5

References

External links
Official website
Facebook
Discogs

Danish musical groups
Musical groups established in 1979
Danish musical duos